The General Organization for Social Insurance (GOSI) is a Saudi Arabian government agency concerned with social insurance in the country. GOSI is supervised by a board of eleven directors from government departments, employers and insured persons.

Calculations of GOSI are based on earning of an employee (basic salary + housing allowance) of a particular organization. 

Calculations are divided into 3 categories:

 GOSI for Saudi National
 GOSI for GCC (Corporation Council for Arab States) Nationals
 GOSI for Non-Saudi Nationals

Government agencies of Saudi Arabia